TRG, also known as Tiny Raskal Gang or Raskals, is a mainly ethnically Cambodian gang based in Eastside Long Beach, California. In the 1990s we began to see Mexican Mafia "green light" or hit lists with the TRG gang featured at the top. Soon all Southern Hispanic or Sureño gangs were at war with the Tiny Rascal Gang. The Mexican Mafia ordered West Side Longo to put aside its rivalry with East Side and support their former rivals against TRG and the black gang.

The gang was founded by Cambodian juvenile youth groups in 1981.The girls are referred to as Lady Raskal Gang.The Cause was to protect Cambodians from various other gangs in Long Beach.TRG and ABZ were originally one gang before ABZ split from TRG during a dispute,TRG made Asian Boyz Gang and CBC gang.TRG was the First Asian gang in Eastside Long Beach.Long Beach TRG still remains holding their ground outnumbered being under one set till this day.Tiny Raskal Gang has over 65,000 active members nationwide and can be found as young as 8 years oldMaking them the largest Asian gang in the United States.Long Beach TRG consist of Asians, Cambodians, Filipinos, Latinos,Whites and African Americans.In certain cities such as Long Beach TRG align themselves with no gangs or Allie’s and refer themselves as being EBK Also known as Everybody Killer. TRG is an established network of individual "sets" or local gangs.The members identify gray as their gang's color of distinction although color association with gangs is a custom and practice that has waned. Cambodians form the majority of their members and are the foundation of the gang, although others are allowed membership.

History
The United States began admitting its first Cambodian refugees in 1979, and until 1991, nearly 158,000 Cambodians were admitted; most of whom were resettled in the states of California, Massachusetts, Virginia, and New York. As with many refugee groups, lack of knowledge concerning the culture and society of the host nation in addition to their limited command of the English language resulted in a socio-cultural barrier. Upon suffering from various issues individually or on a smaller scale, such as post-traumatic stress disorder and depression, their socio-economic disadvantage and environmental setbacks contributed to their adversity in North America. Cambodian-American communities were largely underprivileged and deeply affected by poverty, among other things.

Action setting in the mid-1980s, a fight occurred between a Latino student and a Cambodian student in Long Beach, an event which led to the formation of the Tiny Rascals. As a means of protection, other Cambodian youths began to form street gangs which later laid the foundation of TRG. While conforming to their various cultural influences and Western society, many Cambodian youths began to understand their positions in society, most of whom had instead recognized their disadvantage, resulting in their gang epidemic in the 1990s. Original gang hand-signs, graffiti, fashion, and other practices were originated and constantly changing in the 1980s and 90s. Shortly after their collectivization, TRG began committing several crimes which included extortion, murder, kidnapping, robbery, burglary, home invasion, drugs and weapons trafficking. Some of the Tiny Rascal members were originally members of the Asian Boyz, a rival gang, and transferred gangs due to friction between other fellow Tiny Rascal members.

Feuding in the early 90s, members of the Tiny Rascals Gang had a violent rivalry with the Long Beach-based East Side Longos MUIE who were predominantly Hispanic. Similarly, while TRG and the Asian Boyz have bitter rivalries, peace and truces have been practiced between the two groups.

Membership
Activity of gang members such as Cambodians of other ethnic and cultural groups are known to have been recruited. There are over 65,000 members nationwide, based primarily on the West Coast, the Southwest and New England. In the 1990s, females were allowed to represent the gang and an all-female branch was formed as "LRG (Lady Rascal Gang)".

As with many other gangs, potential members must first be initiated in a "jump in" where they would have to fight other members of the gang or endure a beating for a specific amount of time. Newer recruits are allegedly required to commit a notable crime as a means to earn respect, whether it be murder, home invasion, drive-by shootings on rival gangs or enemies, or robbery. Respect and credibility within the gang revolved around a number of crimes individuals would commit either on behalf of or in favor of the gang. Their gang colors are grey and black. In contrast to their rivals, the Asian Boyz. 

Further, there is a presence of TRG members/sets within the US army as well. As of 2011, none were found to be in the US air force, navy, or marines. There are also some TRG sets found within various prisons in the USA including South Carolina. It is important to note that because of the low percentage of Asian Americans in some prisons, all Asian gang members clique up to represent an Asian set regardless of their hood's historical rivalries with each other.

Activities
Although the Tiny Rascals are involved in a wide range of criminal activities which include extortion, robbery, burglary, auto theft, gang protection, and murder, which are some of the more publicized criminal activities. While young members of the gang are mostly involved in street crimes, some members have progressed towards serious organized criminal activities larger in scale. The older sets maintain a working relationship with similar sets of a fellow Southeast Asian gang called Asian Boyz. They have formed alliances with Chinese organizations such as the 14K, Wah Ching and Wo Hop To in California, and the New York City-based Ghost Shadows. Although in some cities such as Long Beach the claim EBK as there is not a gang that sees them as Allie's .

In the late 1980s and early 1990s, several Rascals violently retaliated to the ongoing harassment of East Side Longos within California, especially Long Beach, and in the Seattle, Washington area. This sparked a deadly war of which resulted in over a hundred casualties suffered among both gangs.

Such cities such as Anchorage, Alaska and Portland, Oregon have had some recorded but less extravagant TRG presence, involved with gun and drug distribution. In smaller towns, in North Carolina, particularly Forest Oaks and Pleasant Garden, sets exist which include many non-Cambodian and non-Asian members. Car thefts and reports of gunfire originated from the gang.

California
In the late 1980s, A car load of TRG gang members pulled up to a car full of East Side Longo gangsters at Anaheim Street and Cherry Avenue in Eastside Long Beach. First the occupants of both cars traded insults and hand signs, and then TRG fired into the Longo car killing a 16-year-old Oswaldo Carbajal.

In 1994, five TRG gang members broke into a San Bernardino home and executed Son (Henry) Nguyen, 44; his wife, Trinh Yen Tran, 35; daughter, Doan Hoang, 15, and sons Daniel Nguyen, 11, and David Nguyen, 10. A 3-year-old son was shot but lived. The child was wounded and left alone overnight with the bodies of his parents and siblings. Henry was shot in the head and neck. One shot was fired with the gun's muzzle placed directly against his skull. He was also shot in the chest at close range while lying on the floor. Four superficial cuts on the back of his neck had been inflicted by a sharp object, like a knifepoint. Trinh was shot once in the thigh and twice in the head, at very close range. Two of her teeth were detached by the force of the bullets. The oldest child, Doan, was shot in the leg, chest, and head. Another bullet pierced a hand that she had held up to protect her face. Daniel was shot in the lower leg and chest. David was shot twice in the chest and once in the back of the head.
 
In 1994, seven TRG members broke into a house in Tustin resulting in the victim being killed, while her baby was home.

In 1994,  TRG gang members raped, robbed and strangled a mother in her Tustin home. She survived by playing dead. Her 3-year-old son was home at the time.

on July 27, 1995, TRG gang members broke into an apartment and killed Quyen Luu and her husband, Hung Dieu Le,47-year-old Hung Le died from a single gunshot to the chest. The second victim, 73-year-old Nghiep Le, was shot in the arm and directly in the face, with the bullet entering through the upper lip.

In 1995, TRG gang members broke into a house and Spokane police responded around 7:30 the next morning to find the bodies of 27-year-old Johnny Hagan, Jr., and 23-year-old Thi Hong Nga Pham. Pham's hands were tied with phone cord, and speaker wire was wrapped around her neck. She was shot in the head, face, and chest. The face and the chest shots came from close range. Pham's jaw was broken in two places; she had also been cut several times in the face and neck. A wedding ring and engagement ring were found inside her mouth. Hagan had also been bound with phone cord and speaker wire. He was shot in the ear, at the base of the skull, and through the back of the head. Two shots  were fired from only an inch or two away. Hagan had bruising and a cut across the front of his neck  wedding ring and engagement ring were found inside her mouth. Hagan had also been bound with phone cord and speaker wire. He was shot in the ear, at the base of the skull, and through the back of the head. Two shots  were fired from only an inch or two away. Hagan had bruising and a cut across the front of his neck. Officers found a bloody knife on a counter and several shell casings from a .45-caliber automatic near the bodies. Police interviewed one of the survivors, four-and-a-half-year-old Joe Hagan, Jr.

On August 6, 1995, TRG defendant gave Evans a gun and followed two men in a red Toyota who they believed were members of the Oriental Boyz, an enemy gang. The driver, later identified as Bunlort Bun, let the passenger out and sped away. Defendant gave chase while Pan and Evans took turns shooting at the car until it swerved to a stop. Defendant pulled up next to the car. Bun was shot five times, with three fatal wounds to the chest and abdomen. The downward trajectory of the bullets was consistent with shots fired into a slumped-over body.

On August 8, 1995, two days after Buns shooting and the day before elm street shootings TRG gang members saw a man in a white pickup truck, defendant made a U-turn, drove at the truck, and pulled a gun. Pan told the women to duck. The truck's driver left the scene. The passenger, Miguel Avina Vargas, died of massive internal bleeding from a bullet to the heart. Ten cartridge casings were recovered from the area.

Although, the Californian expect gang identifier (Mikkeller Prince) changed laws and impacted Tiny Rascal Gang members as well. Basically, if police can identify a person as a gang member, that person can be arrested. This was seen in Sacramento when a member of a set was arrested after police found out he was in the gang, later he would be charged with more. Sacramento also houses at least 100 members and drug dealing appears to be its main source of income.

In 2007, one of the Sacramento sets killed a police officer. Detective Nguyen had been shot three times—in the neck, in the abdomen, and in the lower back. All three injuries were potentially fatal. Nguyen's finger was on the trigger of his gun, but the gun had not been fired. The TRG member was 16 when he did it, defendant repeatedly claimed "That cop deserved it." There was evidence that defendant had stated to a police officer in March 2007 that he was TRG "for life."A lay witness opined that TRG had a "strong–ass hatred over officers" and that TRG saw this attitude "as part of the gang life."

Difference between the two gang rivalry between Asian Boyz and Tiny Rascal Gang had involved innocent people, including the accidental shooting of a pregnant woman in 2006 in Fresno.

In 2012, TRG members in Oakland fatally shot 18-year-old Hiroshi Kai in a drive-by shooting. Police took over 30 minutes to arrive, and Hiroshi was found dead at the scene along with his younger sister who made a call for EMS.

In 2016, six people, including four of the gang's members, were rounded up in a multi-county raid in connection with the late-night killing of 16-year-old Juan Carlos Rodriguez. Connected to a tagging crew in Tustin. Rodriguez, shot in the back, died after being shot during a shower of bullets that rained down outside a house party. His killer, according to Tustin police, is a member of TRG.

in 2019, twelve TRG gang members were connected to a mass shooting at a pre-Halloween party in Eastside Long Beach that left three dead 25-year-old Maurice Poe Jr.,35-year-old Melvin Williams II, and 28-year-old Ricardo Torres. Nine were wounded, including Jasmine Johnson, who was hit by a bullet that shattered her T-3 vertebrae, leaving her paralyzed from the chest down, according to LBPD Sgt. Chris Valdez.

Massachusetts and Rhode Island 
Altogether Tiny Rascal Gang also has a presence among the Cambodian-American communities of Lowell, Massachusetts. According to local police, several hundred TRG members have lived within the Lowell and Lynn areas historically, and are still extant within the region. The gang was connected to over five homicides and several assaults throughout Lowell and Lynn within 1998 and 2021.

In Providence, there are reports of a rivalry between the Surenos and TRG. There were reports of underage drinking by TRG members who had connections with the staff.

Maryland and Virginia
Among the Tiny Rascal Gang in Virginia have been connected to many crimes including property crimes, extortion, robberies, drug distribution, stabbings, assaults, shootings, and murder. Virginia, primarily in the Northern Virginia area adjacent to Washington, D.C., is home to approximately 5,000 to 8,000 Cambodians, many of whom live in Arlington, Fairfax County, Falls Church, and Richmond. There is also a community in Silver Spring, Maryland. Virginia now has what it says are the toughest gang laws in the nation, partly because of the violent actions of gangs such as the TRG. One of the first murders in the Virginia/Maryland area happened in 1996 at a South Arlington, Virginia apartment complex which left a teenage gang member dead.

In February 1998, a fatal drive-by shooting occurred near George C. Marshall High School, in which a 17-year-old boy was killed by a .22 rifle. The gunman, an 18-year-old TRG member, was sentenced to life imprisonment in August 1998. Two others TRG members, including a driver, were found guilty of felony assault for their roles in the attack, and received sentences of 20 years and 17 years. A third teenager was sentenced to 4 years in the Juvenile Detention Center for his role in the shooting.

Violence was reported in the Richmond area in 2009, which was a shooting into a house with no injuries.

Sentencing in all aforementioned cases ranged from 5 to 25 years incarceration, deportation, and life imprisonment.

Ohio
Within Columbus there was a shooting on Christmas Day 2015 from a Tiny Rascal Gang member. The member appeared Caucasian yet the victim has an Asian name, so it is unclear the racial make-up of the Columbus sets. It is also unclear if the murder was gang-related.

Utah
Although, Tiny Rascal Gang has a presence within Salt Lake City with their main rivals being other Asian gangs such as Oriental Laotian Gang, Asian Deuce and Laos Boy Crips. They are also allies with Tiny Oriental Posse and Viet Family. Asian gangs in the area are considered to be very nomadic and not turf oriented. Utah's Asian gangs have been linked with violent crime and home invasions.

Texas
Amongst at least 500 gangs in the Fort Worth and Dallas Asian and Hispanic gangs remain the main ethnic gangs. Of Asian gangs in Texas the Tiny Rascal Gang and Asian Boyz remain the main national gangs. These gangs are known to facilitate a great deal of illegal activity, such as drug distribution, not only in their home turf (in metropolitan Dallas/Fort-Worth) but in suburban areas which are located at interstate points or major highways in the Dallas County and Tarrant County. Once they have run out of drug supplies they will return home to stock up. The product of this is that there are now some sets within the suburban areas.

Michigan
Many TRG gang members can be found in Holland and are currently having a dispute with Latin Kingswhich led to an attempted murder of a Filipino TRG member in 2016. There is also a sub-set of TRG called TRG Jnrs. Much like many Mid-Western gangs, the Tiny Rascal Gang has alliances with the Folk Nation. Possibly explaining the turf war between Latin Kings.

Pennsylvania
Police came as Tiny Rascal Gang to considered them as the largest Asian gangs in Philadelphia along with D-Block and Red Scorpions. In South Philadelphia TRG rivals with Red Scorpions, with shooting flaring up every few years. The two main sets of Philadelphia TRG include Sixth Street and Fifteenth Street. In 2005 Tiny Rascal gang got into a feud with D-Block which resulted in the murder of a female associate and a TRG member. The South Philadelphia sets are known to extort money and run prostitution rings. Something which is considered similar to Italian Organised Crime in Philadelphia. In 2000 an Asian Blood Gangmember was brutally robbed by four TRG members. All four members were convicted, as a result of the trial the Blood gang member was murdered shortly after

Tennessee & Kentucky
In La Vegne a Nashville set of TRG did an armed robbery. The youth were all charged. Their presence according to TBI in 1999 suggests they have sets in Rutherford County and Davidson County.
In Bowling Green, Kentucky, the Asian Boyz and Tiny Rascal gang have presence. However the Cochran chapter of Tiny Rascal Gang have a main rivalry with the Asian Mafia. Also in Bowling Green circa 1997 there was a shooting of an Asian couple by Laotian Tiny Rascal Gang members during a home invasion resulting in a death. The gang calls new members 'Baby Rascals' and older members 'The G's'

Media depiction
Rascal Love and Cambodian Son, have been about Tiny Rascal members. Gangland has also dedicated an episode to Tiny Rascal Gang sets in Fresno.

See also
 Deportation of Cambodians from the United States

References

External links
The-dispatch.com
Ocregister.com
Rascal Love Documentary
Cambodian Son Documentary
Gangland: California's Killing Fields Documentary

Organizations established in 1981
1981 establishments in California
Asian-American gangs
Street gangs
Gangs in Los Angeles
Gangs in California
Gangs in Massachusetts
Gangs in Philadelphia
Gangs in Virginia
Gangs in Washington, D.C.
Organizations based in Long Beach, California
Cambodian-American culture
Asian-American culture in Los Angeles